Oaklands Secondary School is a school in the Western Cape of South Africa. It is located in the suburb of Lansdowne, in Cape Town.

References

Schools in Cape Town